Peter Bjur (born 2 February 2000) is a Danish professional footballer who plays as a midfielder for Danish Superliga club AGF. He has represented Denmark at youth level. He is the son of former Danish international and Brøndby IF player Ole Bjur.

Early life 
Peter Bjur was born in Rødovre, a suburb of Copenhagen. His father, Ole Bjur, is a former professional player for Brøndby IF and the Denmark national team. He also has a mother and a sister, with whom he has lived in Rødovre his entire life. His uncle, Jan Bjur, is also a former professional footballer.

Club career

Early career 
Bjur began his career at BK Avarta, having his first practice the day after turning five years old. He played in Avarta for several years before moving to B.93 as an under-15 player. He made his senior-team debut as a seventeen-year-old on 1 March 2017, coming on as a 35th-minute substitute in a 3–0 loss to Danish Superliga club F.C. Copenhagen in the Danish Cup round of 16 at Parken Stadium.

Brøndby

2017–20 
On 1 July 2017, Bjur signed a three-year contract with Brøndby IF and joined the club on under-17 level.  On 15 August 2019, he made his first team debut as a 73rd-minute substitute for Simon Hedlund against Portuguese opposition Braga in Brøndby's UEFA Europa League play-offs, scoring an 85th-minute goal. A few days later, on 18 August, Bjur made his Danish Superliga debut coming on as a second-half substitute against AaB. As the summer transfer window closed, the club stated that they did not want to loan out Bjur, despite the squad being too large. On 13 December, he signed a new three-and-a-half-year contract with Brøndby, running until 2023. He made his only second league appearance for the club on 5 July 2020, coming on as a second-half substitute in a 0–2 loss to AaB in the Superliga.

2020–21 
Prior to the 2020–21 season, in pre-season friendlies against Næstved Boldklub, FC Helsingør, OB and English side Crystal Palace, Bjur was utilised at the left wing-back position. On his positional change, he stated: "Of course, moving down and playing on the wing-back is a bit of an upheaval. But many of the skills I have previously used on the right wing are some of the same things that recur on the wingback". Head coach Niels Frederiksen subsequently praised Bjur's performances on the new position.

On 13 September, on the first matchday of the new season, Bjur made his first start for Brøndby at the left wing-back position in a 3–2 home win over Nordsjælland. After starter Blás Riveros fell out with a serious knee injury in November 2020, Bjur took over as starter at left wing-back, but he himself fell out with an injury in a match against AGF on 7 December.

AGF
On 27 January 2023, Bjur signed a four-year contract with AGF.

International career 
Bjur has won 2 caps for Denmark at U17 and U18 level.

Career statistics

Honours
Brøndby
 Danish Superliga: 2020–21

References

External links 
 
 Peter Bjur at brondby.com
 

2000 births
Living people
People from Rødovre
BK Avarta players
Boldklubben af 1893 players
Brøndby IF players
Aarhus Gymnastikforening players
Danish men's footballers
Denmark youth international footballers
Association football midfielders
Danish Superliga players
Footballers from Copenhagen